The 2016–17 New York Rangers season was the franchise's 90th season of play and their 91st season overall. The team began its regular games on October 13, 2016 against the New York Islanders.

Standings

Schedule and results

Pre-season

|- style="background:#cfc;"
| 1 || September 27 || New York Islanders || 5–2 || 1–0–0
|- style="background:#cfc;"
| 2 || September 29 || New Jersey Devils || 3–1 || 2–0–0
|- style="background:#fcc;"
| 3 || October 1 || @ New Jersey Devils || 4–5 || 2–1–0
|- style="background:#fff;"
| 4 || October 3 || @ Philadelphia Flyers || 3–4 (OT) || 2–1–1
|- style="background:#fff;"
| 5 || October 4 || @ New York Islanders || 2–3 (OT) || 2–1–2
|- style="background:#fcc;"
| 6 || October 6 || Philadelphia Flyers || 4–2 || 2–2–2
|-

Regular season

|- style="background:#cfc;"
| 1 || October 13 || NY Islanders || 5–3 ||  || Lundqvist || Madison Square Garden || 18,200 || 1–0–0 || 2 || Recap
|- style="background:#fcc;"
| 2 || October 15 || @ St. Louis || 2–3 ||  || Lundqvist || Scottrade Center || 19,197 || 1–1–0 || 2 || Recap
|- style="background:#cfc;"
| 3 || October 17 || San Jose || 7–4 ||  || Raanta || Madison Square Garden || 18,200 || 2–1–0 || 4 || Recap
|- style="background:#fcc;"
| 4 || October 19 || Detroit || 1–2 ||  || Lundqvist || Madison Square Garden || 18,200 || 2–2–0 || 4 || Recap
|- style="background:#cfc;"
| 5 || October 22 || @ Washington || 4–2 ||  || Lundqvist || Verizon Center || 18,506 || 3–2–0 || 6 || Recap
|- style="background:#cfc;"
| 6 || October 23 || Arizona || 3–2 ||  || Lundqvist || Madison Square Garden || 18,006 || 4–2–0 || 8 || Recap
|- style="background:#cfc;"
| 7 || October 26 || Boston || 5–2 ||  || Lundqvist || Madison Square Garden || 18,006 || 5–2–0 || 10 || Recap
|- style="background:#fcc;"
| 8 || October 28 || @ Carolina || 2–3 || || Lundqvist || PNC Arena || 18,380 || 5–3–0 || 10 || Recap
|- style="background:#cfc;"
| 9 || October 30 || Tampa Bay || 6–1 ||  || Raanta || Madison Square Garden || 18,006 || 6–3–0 || 12 || Recap
|-

|- style="background:#cfc;"
| 10 || November 1 || St. Louis || 5–0 ||  || Lundqvist || Madison Square Garden || 18,006 || 7–3–0 || 14 || Recap
|- style="background:#cfc;"
| 11 || November 3 || Edmonton || 5–3 ||  || Lundqvist || Madison Square Garden || 18,006 || 8–3–0 || 16 || Recap
|- style="background:#cfc;"
| 12 || November 5 || @ Boston || 5–2 ||  || Raanta || TD Garden || 17,565 || 9–3–0 || 18 || Recap
|- style="background:#cfc;"
| 13 || November 6 || Winnipeg || 5–2 ||  || Lundqvist || Madison Square Garden || 18,006 || 10–3–0 || 20 || Recap
|- style="background:#fcc;"
| 14 || November 8 || Vancouver || 3–5 ||  || Raanta || Madison Square Garden || 18,006 || 10–4–0 || 20 || Recap
|- style="background:#cfc;" 
| 15 || November 12 || @ Calgary || 4–1 ||  || Lundqvist || Scotiabank Saddledome || 19,289 || 11–4–0 || 22|| Recap
|- style="background:#cfc;"
| 16 || November 13 || @ Edmonton || 3–1 ||  || Raanta || Rogers Place || 18,347 || 12–4–0 || 24 || Recap
|- style="background:#cfc;"
| 17 || November 15 || @ Vancouver || 7–2 ||  || Lundqvist || Rogers Arena || 17,814 || 13–4–0 || 26 || Recap
|- style="background:#fcc;"
| 18 || November 18 || @ Columbus || 2–4 ||  || Lundqvist || Nationwide Arena || 14,541 || 13–5–0 || 26 || Recap
|- style="background:#fff;"
| 19 || November 20 || Florida || 2–3 || SO || Lundqvist || Madison Square Garden || 18,006 || 13–5–1 || 27 || Recap
|- style="background:#cfc;"
| 20 || November 21 || @ Pittsburgh || 5–2 ||  || Raanta || Consol Energy Center || 18,632 || 14–5–1 || 29 || Recap
|- style="background:#fcc;"
| 21 || November 23 || Pittsburgh || 1–6 ||  || Lundqvist || Madison Square Garden || 18,006 || 14–6–1 || 29 || Recap
|- style="background:#cfc;"
| 22 || November 25 || @ Philadelphia || 3–2 ||  || Lundqvist || Wells Fargo Center || 19,981 || 15–6–1 || 31 || Recap
|- style="background:#fcc;"
| 23 || November 27 || Ottawa || 0–2 ||  || Raanta || Madison Square Garden || 18,006 || 15–7–1 || 31 || Recap
|- style="background:#cfc;"
| 24 || November 29 || Carolina || 3–2 ||  || Lundqvist || Madison Square Garden || 18,006 || 16–7–1 || 33 || Recap
|-

|- style="background:#fcc;"
| 25 || December 1 || @ Buffalo || 3–4 ||  || Lundqvist || First Niagara Center || 18,047 || 16–8–1 || 33 || Recap
|- style="background:#cfc;"
| 26 || December 3 || Carolina || 4–2 ||  || Lundqvist || Madison Square Garden || 18,006 || 17–8–1 || 35 || Recap
|- style="background:#fcc;"
| 27 || December 6 || @ NY Islanders || 2–4 ||  || Lundqvist || Barclays Center || 15,795 || 17–9–1 || 35 || Recap
|- style="background:#cfc;"
| 28 || December 8 || @ Winnipeg || 2–1 ||  || Raanta || MTS Centre || 15,294 || 18–9–1 || 37 || Recap
|- style="background:#cfc;"
| 29 || December 9 || @ Chicago || 1–0 || OT || Raanta || United Center || 21,770 || 19–9–1 || 39 || Recap
|- style="background:#cfc;"
| 30 || December 11 || New Jersey || 5–0 ||  || Raanta || Madison Square Garden || 18,006 || 20–9–1 || 41 || Recap
|- style="background:#fcc;"
| 31 || December 13 || Chicago || 1–2 ||  || Raanta || Madison Square Garden || 18,006 || 20–10–1 || 41 || Recap
|- style="background:#cfc;"
| 32 || December 15 || @ Dallas || 2–0 ||  || Lundqvist || American Airlines Center || 18,212 || 21–10–1 || 43 || Recap
|- style="background:#cfc;"
| 33 || December 17 || @ Nashville || 2–1 || SO || Lundqvist || Bridgestone Arena || 17,113 || 22–10–1 || 45 || Recap
|- style="background:#cfc;"
| 34 || December 18 || New Jersey || 3–2 || SO || Lundqvist || Madison Square Garden || 18,006 || 23–10–1 || 47 || Recap
|- style="background:#fcc;"
| 35 || December 20 || @ Pittsburgh || 2–7 ||  || Raanta || Consol Energy Center || 18,541 || 23–11–1 || 47 || Recap
|- style="background:#fcc;"
| 36 || December 23 || Minnesota || 4–7 ||  || Raanta || Madison Square Garden || 18,006 || 23–12–1 || 47 || Recap
|- style="background:#cfc;"
| 37 || December 27 || Ottawa || 4–3 ||  || Raanta || Madison Square Garden || 18,006 || 24–12–1 || 49 || Recap
|- style="background:#cfc;"
| 38 || December 29 || @ Arizona || 6–3 ||  || Raanta || Gila River Arena || 15,090 || 25–12–1 || 51 || Recap
|- style="background:#cfc;"
| 39 || December 31 || @ Colorado || 6–2 ||  || Lundqvist || Pepsi Center || 17,609 || 26–12–1 || 53 || Recap
|-

|- style="background:#fcc;"
| 40 || January 3 || Buffalo || 1–4 ||  || Lundqvist || Madison Square Garden || 18,006 || 26–13–1 || 53 || Recap
|- style="background:#cfc;"
| 41 || January 4 || @ Philadelphia || 5–2 ||  || Lundqvist || Wells Fargo Center || 19,858 || 27–13–1 || 55 || Recap
|- style="background:#cfc;"
| 42 || January 7 || @ Columbus || 5–4 ||  || Lundqvist || Nationwide Arena || 19,001 || 28–13–1 || 57 || Recap
|- style="background:#fcc;"
| 43 || January 13 || Toronto || 2–4 ||  || Lundqvist || Madison Square Garden || 18,006 || 28–14–1 || 57 || Recap
|- style="background:#fcc;"
| 44 || January 14 || @ Montreal || 4–5 ||  || Lundqvist || Bell Centre || 21,288 || 28–15–1 || 57 || Recap
|- style="background:#fcc;"
| 45 || January 17 || Dallas || 6–7 ||  || Lundqvist || Madison Square Garden || 18,006 || 28–16–1 || 57 || Recap
|- style="background:#cfc;"
| 46 || January 19 || @ Toronto || 5–2 ||  || Lundqvist || Air Canada Centre || 19,088 || 29–16–1 || 59 || Recap
|- style="background:#cfc;"
| 47 || January 22 || @ Detroit || 1–0 || OT || Lundqvist || Joe Louis Arena || 20,027 || 30–16–1 || 61 || Recap
|- style="background:#cfc;"
| 48 || January 23 || Los Angeles || 3–2 ||  || Lundqvist || Madison Square Garden || 18,006 || 31–16–1 || 63 || Recap
|- style="background:#fcc;"
| 49 || January 25 || Philadelphia || 0–2 ||  || Lundqvist || Madison Square Garden || 18,006 || 31–17–1 || 63 || Recap
|- style="background:#bbcaff;"
|colspan="2" | January 27–29 ||colspan="10" | All-Star Break in Los Angeles
|- style="background:#fcc;"
| 50 || January 31 || Columbus || 4–6 ||  || Raanta || Madison Square Garden || 18,006 || 31–18–1 || 63 || Recap
|-

|- style="background:#cfc;"
| 51 || February 2 || @ Buffalo || 2–1 || OT || Lundqvist || First Niagara Center || 18,941 || 32–18–1 || 65 || Recap
|- style="background:#cfc;"
| 52 || February 5 || Calgary || 4–3 ||  || Lundqvist || Madison Square Garden || 18,006 || 33–18–1 || 67 || Recap
|- style="background:#cfc;"
| 53 || February 7 || Anaheim || 4–1 ||  || Lundqvist || Madison Square Garden || 18,006 || 34–18–1 || 69 || Recap
|- style="background:#cfc;"
| 54 || February 9 || Nashville || 4–3 ||  || Lundqvist || Madison Square Garden || 18,006 || 35–18–1 || 71 || Recap
|- style="background:#cfc;"
| 55 || February 11 || Colorado || 4–2 ||  || Lundqvist || Madison Square Garden || 18,006 || 36–18–1 || 73 || Recap
|- style="background:#cfc;"
| 56 || February 13 || @ Columbus || 3–2 ||  || Raanta || Nationwide Arena || 14,378 || 37–18–1 || 75 || Recap
|- style="background:#fcc;"
| 57 || February 16 || @ NY Islanders || 2–4 ||  || Lundqvist || Barclays Center || 15,795 || 37–18–1 || 75 || Recap
|- style="background:#cfc;"
| 58 || February 19 || Washington || 2–1 ||  || Lundqvist || Madison Square Garden || 18,006 || 38–19–1 || 77 || Recap
|- style="background:#fff;"
| 59 || February 21 || Montreal || 2–3 || SO || Lundqvist || Madison Square Garden || 18,006 || 38–19–2 || 78 || Recap
|- style="background:#cfc;"
| 60 || February 23 || @ Toronto || 2–1 || SO || Lundqvist || Air Canada Centre || 19,175 || 39–19–2 || 80 || Recap
|- style="background:#cfc;"
| 61 || February 25 || @ New Jersey || 4–3 || OT || Raanta || Prudential Center || 16,514 || 40–19–2 || 82 || Recap
|- style="background:#fcc;"
| 62 || February 26 || Columbus || 2–5 ||  || Lundqvist || Madison Square Garden || 18,006 || 40–20–2 || 82 || Recap
|- style="background:#fcc;"
| 63 || February 28 || Washington || 1–4 ||  || Lundqvist || Madison Square Garden || 18,006 || 40–21–2 || 82 || Recap
|-

|- style="background:#cfc;"
| 64 || March 2 || @ Boston || 2–1 ||  || Lundqvist || TD Garden ||  17,565 || 41–21–2 || 84 || Recap
|- style="background:#fcc;"
| 65 || March 4 || Montreal || 1–4 ||  || Lundqvist || Madison Square Garden || 18,006 || 41–22–2 || 84 || Recap
|- style="background:#cfc;"
| 66 || March 6 || @ Tampa Bay || 1–0 || OT || Raanta || Amalie Arena || 19,092 || 42–22–2 || 86 || Recap
|- style="background:#cfc;"
| 67 || March 7 || @ Florida || 5–2 ||  || Lundqvist || BB&T Center || 16,116 || 43–22–2 || 88 || Recap
|- style="background:#fcc;"
| 68 || March 9 || @ Carolina || 3–4 ||  || Raanta || PNC Arena || 11,404 || 43–23–2 || 88 || Recap
|- style="background:#cfc;"
| 69 || March 12 || @ Detroit || 4–1 ||  || Raanta || Joe Louis Arena || 20,027  || 44–23–2 || 90 || Recap
|- style="background:#fcc;"
| 70 || March 13 || Tampa Bay || 2–3 ||  || Raanta || Madison Square Garden || 18,006 || 44–24–2 || 90 || Recap
|- style="background:#fff;"
| 71 || March 17 || Florida || 3–4 || SO || Raanta || Madison Square Garden || 18,006 || 44–24–3 || 91 || Recap
|- style="background:#cfc;"
| 72 || March 18 || @ Minnesota || 3–2 ||  || Raanta || Xcel Energy Center || 19,337 || 45–24–3 || 93 || Recap
|- style="background:#fff;"
| 73 || March 21 || @ New Jersey || 2–3 || OT || Raanta || Prudential Center || 16,514 || 45–24–4 || 94 || Recap
|- style="background:#fcc;"
| 74 || March 22 || NY Islanders || 2–3 ||  || Raanta || Madison Square Garden || 18,006 || 45–25–4 || 94 || Recap
|- style="background:#cfc;"
| 75 || March 25 || @ Los Angeles || 3–0 ||  || Raanta || Staples Center || 18,230 || 46–25–4 || 96 || Recap
|- style="background:#fcc;"
| 76 || March 26 || @ Anaheim || 3–6 ||  || Lundqvist || Honda Center || 17,174 || 46–26–4 || 96 || Recap
|- style="background:#fff;"
| 77 || March 28 || @ San Jose || 4–5 || OT || Lundqvist || SAP Center || 17,562 || 46–26–5 || 97 || Recap
|- style="background:#fff;"
| 78 || March 31 || Pittsburgh || 3–4 || SO || Lundqvist || Madison Square Garden || 18,006 || 46–26–6 || 98 || Recap
|-

|- style="background:#cfc;"
| 79 || April 2 || Philadelphia || 4–3 ||  || Lundqvist || Madison Square Garden || 18,006 || 47–26–6 || 100 || Recap
|- style="background:#fcc;"
| 80 || April 5 || @ Washington || 0–2 ||  || Lundqvist || Verizon Center || 18,506 || 47–27–6 || 100 || Recap
|- style="background:#fcc;"
| 81 || April 8 || @ Ottawa || 1–3 ||  || Lundqvist || Canadian Tire Centre || 18,976 || 47–28–6 || 100 || Recap
|- style="background:#cfc;"
| 82 || April 9 || Pittsburgh || 3–2 ||  || Hellberg || Madison Square Garden || 18,006 || 48–28–6 || 102 || Recap
|-

|-
|

Playoffs

The Rangers qualified for the playoffs for the seventh consecutive season, entering as the Wild Card in the Eastern Conference and being matched up against the Montreal Canadiens in the first round. The Rangers defeated the Canadiens in six games, moving on to round 2 against the Ottawa Senators. The Rangers were then eliminated by the Senators in six games.

|- style="background:#cfc;"
| 1 || April 12 || @ Montreal || 2–0 || Lundqvist || Rangers lead 1–0
|- style="background:#fcc;"
| 2 || April 14 || @ Montreal || 3–4 OT || Lundqvist || Series tied 1–1
|- style="background:#fcc;"
| 3 || April 16 || Montreal || 1–3 || Lundqvist || Canadiens lead 2–1
|- style="background:#cfc;"
| 4 || April 18 || Montreal || 2–1 || Lundqvist || Series tied 2–2
|- style="background:#cfc;"
| 5 || April 20 || @ Montreal || 3–2 OT || Lundqvist || Rangers lead 3–2
|- style="background:#cfc;"
| 6 || April 22 || Montreal || 3–1 || Lundqvist || Rangers win series 4–2
|-

|- style="background:#fcc;"
| 1 || April 27 || @ Ottawa || 1–2 || Lundqvist || Senators lead 1–0
|- style="background:#fcc;"
| 2 || April 29 || @ Ottawa || 5–6 2OT || Lundqvist || Senators lead 2–0
|- style="background:#cfc;"
| 3 || May 2 || Ottawa || 4–1 || Lundqvist || Senators lead 2–1
|- style="background:#cfc;"
| 4 || May 4 || Ottawa || 4–1 || Lundqvist || Series tied 2–2
|- style="background:#fcc;"
| 5 || May 6 || @ Ottawa || 4–5 OT || Lundqvist || Senators lead 3–2
|- style="background:#fcc;"
| 6 || May 9 || Ottawa || 2–4 || Lundqvist || Senators win series 4–2
|-

|-
|

Player statistics
Final stats
Skaters

Goaltenders

†Denotes player spent time with another team before joining the Rangers. Stats reflect time with the Rangers only.
‡Denotes player was traded mid-season. Stats reflect time with the Rangers only.
Bold/italics denotes franchise record.

Awards and honors

Awards

Milestones

Records

Transactions
The Rangers have been involved in the following transactions during the 2016–17 season:

Trades

Notes

Free agents acquired

Free agents lost

Claimed via waivers

Lost via waivers

Lost via retirement

Player signings

Draft picks

Below are the New York Rangers' selections at the 2016 NHL Entry Draft, to be held on June 24–25, 2016 at the First Niagara Center in Buffalo, New York.

Draft notes
 The New York Rangers' first-round pick went to the Detroit Red Wings as the result of a trade on June 24, 2016 that sent Pavel Datsyuk and a first-round pick in 2016 (16th overall) to Arizona in exchange for Joe Vitale, a compensatory second-round pick in 2016 (53rd overall) and this pick. Arizona previously acquired this pick as the result of a trade on March 1, 2015 that sent Keith Yandle, Chris Summers and a fourth-round pick in 2016 to New York in exchange for John Moore, Anthony Duclair, Tampa Bay's second-round pick in 2015 and this pick (being conditional at the time of the trade). The condition – Arizona will receive a first-round pick in 2016 if New York qualifies for the 2016 Stanley Cup playoffs – was converted on April 4, 2016.
 The New York Rangers' second-round pick went to the Chicago Blackhawks as the result of a trade on June 15, 2016 that sent Teuvo Teravainen and Bryan Bickell to Carolina in exchange for Chicago's third-round pick in 2017 and this pick.
  The Arizona Coyotes' fourth-round pick went to the New York Rangers as the result of a trade on March 1, 2015 that sent John Moore, Anthony Duclair, Tampa Bay's second-round pick in 2015 and a conditional first-round pick in 2016 to Arizona in exchange for Keith Yandle, Chris Summers and this pick.
 The New York Rangers' fourth-round pick went to the San Jose Sharks as the result of a trade on March 1, 2015 that sent James Sheppard to New York in exchange for this pick.
  The Florida Panthers' sixth-round pick went to the New York Rangers as the result of a trade on June 20, 2016 that sent Keith Yandle to Florida in exchange for a conditional fourth-round pick in 2017 and this pick.

References

New York Rangers seasons
New York Rangers
New York Rangers
New York Rangers
New York Rangers
 in Manhattan
Madison Square Garden